Glenea citrina is a species of beetle in the family Cerambycidae. It was described by James Thomson in 1865. It is known from Laos, Java, Borneo, Malaysia, and Sumatra.

Varietas
 Glenea citrina var. anthyllis Pascoe, 1866
 Glenea citrina var. griseoapicalis Breuning, 1958
 Glenea citrina var. plurisignata Breuning, 1958

References

citrina
Beetles described in 1865